Apenisa Cakaubalavu (born 14 February 1993) is a Fijian rugby union player, currently playing for Rugby United New York (RUNY) of Major League Rugby (MLR). His preferred position is wing.

Professional career
Cakaubalavu signed for Major League Rugby side Rugby United New York ahead of the 2021 Major League Rugby season. 

He had previously represented Fiji Sevens at 13 competitions between 2017 and 2020.

References

External links
itsrugby.co.uk Profile

1993 births
Living people
Fijian rugby union players
Rugby union wings
Rugby New York players